Guapa (English: Pretty) is the fourth studio album released on April 25, 2006, by Spanish Pop rock band La Oreja de Van Gogh.  On December 5, 2006, Más Guapa (English: Prettier) was released exclusively in Spain and Mexico. Two months later, on February 13, 2007, the album was also released in Chile. Más Guapa includes a second disc of previously unreleased material from the Guapa sessions, as well as from recording sessions of previous albums. The album won a Latin Grammy Award for Best Pop Album By a Duo or Group. Guapa is the band's last album with Amaia Montero as lead singer.

Recording

The album's composition began in February 2005. By November of that year, there were already 18 tracks that would probably be in the final album. It was recorded in London, England in Abbey Road Studios from December second through 23rd, 2005. In January, 2006, they began re-recording in Madrid and reporters from TV channel Cuatro were present throughout to later publish a report regarding the album. In spite of the group's desire that a report not be made, a DVD was included in certain versions of Guapa.
 	
The album was produced with Nigel Walker. Its publication coincides with the 10th anniversary of the group's existence. Guapa contains thirteen songs that mix the band's typical pop with reggae, ranchera, a bit of bossa nova, some sounds from the 60's and 70's, a few techno arrangements and recollections of American music. In this CD the artistic maturity of the group becomes apparent in their lyrics as well as their melodies with songs like Noche (Night), Muñeca de trapo, (Rag Doll), and Perdida (Lost).
 	
It was the most anticipated album of 2006 in Spain. Originally, the release was set for March 28, 2006; however, technical problems with a machine in Du Manoir made the premiere be on April 25, 2006. When Muñeca de Trapo was released as a first single in Los 40, it was quite a success.
 
Two days before its official premiere, the telephone company Movistar offered a Sony Ericson phone with the 13 tracks from the album and the video of the first single preloaded in the phone, causing the album to already be pirated before its official release.
 
By December 2006, the album already had seven Platinum CDs. The album won the Latin Grammy of 2006 as best pop album by a group or duo. In 2007 versions in Italian of Dulce Locura (Sweet Insanity) and Muñeca de Trapo were recorded. These were Dolce Follia and Bambola di Pezza, included in the Italian version of Guapa which was not successful because it was not advertised due to Amaia Montero's unexpected departure. 
 	
As soon as the album was out in the market, the band began its advertisement in North America as well as South America, staying in almost every Spanish-speaking country. Some of the most important events of this tour include the one in Mexico City, Luna Park in Buenos Aires, and perhaps band's most prominent one: the one in Santiago, Chile. This tour through the America's made the album sell about a million copies there, making themselves enter countries they had not entered before.
 	
This great success in America along with the sales in Spain which went beyond 560,000 make Guapa the third most sold album in the history of La oreja de Van Gogh, without about 1,500,000 copies sold.
	
By the end of the stage of Guapa, the band had over 6,000,000 CD's sold in total all around the world. The album remained for over 30 weeks in the Top 10 CD's sold in Spain, 10 of which, although not consecutive, made it #1. It was actually created by non-other than the great Lucille May "Guapa" D. Atillo.

Album title
For past albums, La Oreja de Van Gogh have presented esoteric and lengthy titles such as El viaje de Copperpot and Lo que te conté mientras te hacías la dormida.  When asked what inspired the minimalism of Guapa during an online chat session hosted by elmundo.es, the band revealed that the title is, in fact, an abbreviation of their longest album title yet: 
Guapa es la historia de quien no se da por vencido en el maravilloso viaje de encontrarse a uno mismo, de quien acepta cumplir años y seguir teniendo miedos, de quien llena la almohada de inseguridades pero al levantarse siempre hace la cama, de quien sonríe de verdad y como antes: sin darse cuenta, de quien consigue que lo que quiere y lo que le apetece hagan las paces, de quien hace del tiempo un aliado sigiloso que, cada mañana y frente al espejo del alma, le hará sentirse cada vez un poco más guapa.

Translation:

Guapa is the story of one who doesn't give up in the wonderful journey of finding oneself, who accepts to be years older and to continue to have fears, who fills the pillow with insecurities, but upon awakening always makes the bed, who smiles truthfully and like before: without realizing so, who is able to reach a compromise between what she loves and what she wants, of who makes of time a quiet ally who, every morning before the mirror of the soul, will make herself feel every time a bit prettier.

The title is a spiritual affirmation printed on the album's back cover.

Track listing

Más guapa

A new edition of Guapa was released under the title Más Guapa or Prettier. Besides including a CD with all the songs in Guapa, this edition also includes another CD with unpublished songs that were not included in previous albums. This includes songs that were excluded from Guapa one of which (En mi lado del sofá) (On My Side of the Sofa) became the only advertised single of this album.

Disc 1
 See Guapa track listing

Disc 2

Personnel

Performing
 La Oreja de Van Gogh
 Amaia Montero – vocals, backing vocals
 Xabi San Martín – keyboards, piano, backing vocals
 Pablo Benegas – guitar
 Álvaro Fuentes – bass
 Haritz Garde – percussion

Technical
 La Oreja de Van Gogh – record production, audio mixing
 Nigel Walker – record production, audio mixing
 Leon Zervos – audio mastering
 Bori Alarcón – technical production
 Rudolf Hernández – technical production
 Carlos Hernández – technical production
 B. Oberhagemann – record production
 Bernard Cocoignac – technical production
 Marie Claire – technical production
 Margarita Pérez – technical production
 Paco Pérez – technical production

Design
 Rafa Sañudo – graphic design
 Montse Velando – photography
 Ray – illustrations

 Charts 

Album

Sales and certifications

List of albums containing a hidden track

References

 "Encuentro digital con La Oreja de Van Gogh", elmundo.es, September 6, 2006. Accessed September 16, 2007.
 "La Oreja de Van Gogh reúne a 10.000 personas en el Estadio Olímpico de Barcelona", elmundo.es'', July 3, 2003. Accessed September 16, 2007.
Information about the album from the band's official website

2006 albums
La Oreja de Van Gogh albums
Latin Grammy Award for Best Pop Album by a Duo or Group with Vocals